was a Japanese amateur photographer particularly noted for his photography of Osaka and his use of color.

Tanaka was born in Ise, Mie (Japan) in 1901.

From 1932 onwards he participated in a variety of amateur photography groups. From 1948 he worked in the Osaka office of Asahi Shinbun's publishing company.

From 1955, Tanaka worked to photograph Kawachi in Osaka, in a series titled Kawachi Fūdoki. In 1962 he started photographing firework displays in color (then still unusual for such purposes), with his camera attached to his moving body.

Starting in the seventies, Tanaka won a series of awards for his long service to amateur photography in the Kansai area. He died on 7 November 1995.

Collections of works by Tanaka
Yume sen'ya. Osaka: Village Press, 1990.  
Shamo to renkon hatake: Nihon no genfūkei Kawachi. Kyoto: Kōrinsha, 1993. 
Kōseki mange. Tokyo: Tanaka Kōtarō Sakuhinshū Iinkai, 1996. 
Shikisai kōkyōgaku ). Bee Books 239. Tokyo: Mitsumura, 1996. .

Notes

References
 Nihon no shashinka / Biographic Dictionary of Japanese Photography. Tokyo: Nichigai Associates, 2005. . P.248. Despite the English-language alternative title, all in Japanese.
 Sekiji Kazuko. "Tanaka Kōtarō". Nihon shashinka jiten / 328 Outstanding Japanese Photographers. Kyoto: Tankōsha, 2000. . P.201. Despite the English-language alternative title, all in Japanese.
 Shashinka wa nani o hyōgen shita ka: 1960–1980 (写真家はなにを表現したか1960～1980, What were photographers expressing? 1960–1980). Tokyo: Konica Plaza, 1992.  Three of Tanaka's photographs of fireworks are on p. 44; a biographical chronology appears on p. 103.

Japanese photographers
People from Ise, Mie
1901 births
1995 deaths
Artists from Mie Prefecture